Phillip Rhys (born Philippe Chaudhary, 14 June 1974) is an English actor and filmmaker.

Early life

Phillip was born Philippe Chaudhary, the second of three sons. A South London native, Phillip's father was a Ugandan-born Punjabi Muslim, and his mother was a French Catholic. Phillip became a world traveler early due to his parents' careers, which allowed the family to visit countries worldwide. In a way, that early love of travel could be viewed as the perfect preparation for life as a filmmaker and actor. After graduating from Westminster College he spent a year living and working in Paris. Upon his return to London, he studied with Marianna Hill at the Lee Strasberg Institute, and then in Los Angeles with Jeffrey Tambor and Milton Katselas at the Beverly Hills Playhouse.

Film and television career
Phillip's film work includes The Adventures of Tintin directed by Steven Spielberg, Wilde Salomé directed by and starring Al Pacino, The Space Between with Oscar winner Melissa Leo, Irvine Welsh's The Magnificent Eleven and Figaro, directed by Bret Easton Ellis - a comedic film inspired by the music of The Barber of Sevilla, for the Opera de Paris.  Rhys' pivotal television roles include the Emmy winning series, 24 (season 2) for which he was part of a SAG ensemble nomination, FX's Golden Globe winning Nip/Tuck and the BBC's post-apocalyptic hit drama Survivors.  Other television credits include a series regular on Flatland with Dennis Hopper, the first US TV show to be shot entirely in China. Rhys is also known for his work in independent films, such as The Space Between with oscar winner Melissa Leo, Punks, Kill the Man, Americanizing Shelley, and Rodrigo Garcia's Fathers and Sons. Rhys also starred as intergalactic rock star Proto Zoa in the Zenon: Girl of the 21st Century series of Disney films and as Tanus, in the miniseries The Seventh Scroll, based on the best selling novel by Wilbur Smith. He has also appeared in single episodes of Shameless, Bones, Glee, CSI and NCIS, amongst others. On Christmas Day 2015, Rhys portrayed Ramone in the Doctor Who Christmas special The Husbands of River Song.

Rhys recurred in several highly anticipated television series, Nightflyers based on the novella by George R. R. Martin, Channel 4's Tripped produced by Harry and Jack Williams (Fleabag), and Kevin Williamson's Tell Me a Story (season 2) for Paramount Plus.

Upcoming projects include the recurring role of Dilip Amagee on Disney+ and FX's "The Full Monty," a limited series based on the BAFTA-winning film twenty-five years later. The original film's lead cast and Academy Award-winning screenwriter Simon Beaufoy "Slumdog Millionaire" is reuniting for the series.

Directing career
Rhys Chaudhary most recently directed episode 616 of American medical drama The Good Doctor for ABC and Hulu. He has directed several commercials and documentary short films over the years, including Xie, Xie, Shanghai and The Rocky.  Phillip produced and directed his narrative short debut, The Scarecrow, starring Sandra Oh. The Scarecrow was nominated for numerous awards, including Best Narrative Short Film at the Tribeca Film Festival, Drama Short Film Festival Grand Prix Best Short Film (International) and won the Accolade Global Film Competition Award of Excellence: Film Short. Phillip was selected to participate as a Fellow in the prestigious Disney ABC Television Directing Program.

Stage career

On stage, he received outstanding reviews for his performance in Dario Fo's The Devil with Boobs and a Drama-Logue Award for his role in the Los Angeles stage production of Come Back to the Five and Dime, Jimmy Dean, Jimmy Dean. Other performances include "John Buchanan Jr." in Tennessee Williams Summer and Smoke and a turn in John Patrick Shanley's The Dreamer Examines His Pillow at Theatre West.

Charity work
He is involved in various non-profit organizations including BAFTA Outreach and is an Inner City Shakespeare Advisory Board Member. Rhys is a Sundance Institute Alumni.

Personal life

On 22 November 2008, Rhys appeared on Soccer AM and confirmed he supports Crystal Palace Football Club.  He speaks French and has travelled extensively. Phillip is a former member of the alternative rock band Egos Aside.  Rhys now lives in London and Los Angeles.

References

External links
 FIGARO by Bret Easton Ellis
 The Huffington Post: interview
 The Times My Hols: interview
 

1972 births
Living people
Male actors from London
English male film actors
English male stage actors
English male television actors
20th-century English male actors
21st-century English male actors